Rudi Mariën is a Belgian scientist and businessman. He is chairman of the Belgian biotech company Innogenetics.

Education
Rudi Mariën obtained a degree in pharmaceutical sciences from the University of Ghent, specializing in clinical biology.

Career
On 18 July 1985, he co-founded the Belgian biotech company Innogenetics, together with Erik Tambuyzer and Hugo Van Heuverswyn and has been its chairman since then. Besides Innogenetics, he founded several clinical laboratories. He is an international centralized clinical laboratory. He is also CEO of Gengest BVBA (management company), Biovest CVA, LMA BVBA, Laboraco BVBA, and he is director of DSJ Bruxelles NV and Oystershell NV. Rudi Mariën is a member of the American Association for Clinical Chemistry.

Sources
 Rudi Mariën
 Ik had met plezier aandelen bijgekocht 

Belgian businesspeople
Ghent University alumni
Living people
Technology company founders
Belgian chairpersons of corporations
Belgian corporate directors
Year of birth missing (living people)